María Cristina Pereyra (born 1964) is a Venezuelan mathematician. She is a professor of mathematics and statistics at the University of New Mexico, and the author of several books on wavelets and harmonic analysis.

Education and employment
Pereyra was a member of the Venezuelan team for the 1981 and 1982 International Mathematical Olympiads. She earned a licenciado (the equivalent of a bachelor's degree) in mathematics in 1986 from the Central University of Venezuela.

She went to Yale University for graduate studies, completing her Ph.D. there in 1993. Her dissertation, Sobolev Spaces On Lipschitz Curves: Paraproducts, Inverses And Some Related Operators, was supervised by Peter Jones. After working for three years as an instructor at Princeton University, she joined the University of New Mexico faculty in 1996.

Books
Pereyra is the author or editor of:
Lecture Notes on Dyadic Harmonic Analysis (Second Summer School in Analysis and Mathematical Physics, Cuernavaca, 2000; Contemporary Mathematics 289, American Mathematical Society, 2001)
Wavelets, Their Friends, and What They Can Do For You (with Martin Mohlenkamp, EMS Lecture Series in Mathematics, European Mathematical Society, 2008)
Harmonic Analysis: from Fourier to Wavelets (with Lesley Ward, Student Mathematical Library 63, American Mathematical Society, 2012)
Harmonic Analysis, Partial Differential Equations, Complex Analysis, Banach Spaces, and Operator Theory: Celebrating Cora Sadosky's Life, Vols. I, II (edited with S. Marcantognini, A. M. Stokolos, and W. Urbina, Association for Women in Mathematics Series, Springer, 2016 and 2017)

References

External links
Home page

1964 births
Living people
Venezuelan mathematicians
20th-century American mathematicians
21st-century American mathematicians
American women mathematicians
Central University of Venezuela alumni
Yale University alumni
Princeton University faculty
University of New Mexico faculty
20th-century women mathematicians
21st-century women mathematicians
20th-century American women
21st-century American women